Huntingtin (Htt) is the protein coded for in humans by the HTT gene, also known as the IT15 ("interesting transcript 15") gene. Mutated HTT is the cause of Huntington's disease (HD), and has been investigated for this role and also for its involvement in long-term memory storage.

It is variable in its structure, as the many polymorphisms of the gene can lead to variable numbers of glutamine residues present in the protein. In its wild-type (normal) form, the polymorphic locus contains 6-35 glutamine residues.  However, in individuals affected by Huntington's disease (an autosomal dominant genetic disorder), the polymorphic locus contains more than 36 glutamine residues (highest reported repeat length is about 250). Its commonly used name is derived from this disease; previously, the IT15 label was commonly used.

The mass of huntingtin protein is dependent largely on the number of glutamine residues it has; the predicted mass is around 350 kDa. Normal huntingtin is generally accepted to be 3144 amino acids in size. The exact function of this protein is not known, but it plays an important role in nerve cells. Within cells, huntingtin may or may not be involved in signaling, transporting materials, binding proteins and other structures, and protecting against apoptosis, a form of programmed cell death. The huntingtin protein is required for normal development before birth. It is expressed in many tissues in the body, with the highest levels of expression seen in the brain.

Gene 
The 5'-end (five prime end) of the HTT gene has a sequence of three DNA bases, cytosine-adenine-guanine (CAG), coding for the amino acid glutamine, that is repeated multiple times. This region is called a trinucleotide repeat. The usual CAG repeat count is between seven and 35 repeats.

The HTT gene is located on the short arm (p) of chromosome 4 at position 16.3, from base pair 3,074,510 to base pair 3,243,960.

Protein

Function 
The function of huntingtin (Htt) is not well understood but it is involved in axonal transport. Huntingtin is essential for development, and its absence is lethal in mice. The protein has no sequence homology with other proteins and is highly expressed in neurons and testes in humans and rodents. Huntingtin upregulates the expression of brain-derived neurotrophic factor (BDNF) at the transcription level, but the mechanism by which huntingtin regulates gene expression has not been determined. From immunohistochemistry, electron microscopy, and subcellular fractionation studies of the molecule, it has been found that huntingtin is primarily associated with vesicles and microtubules. These appear to indicate a functional role in cytoskeletal anchoring or transport of mitochondria. The Htt protein is involved in vesicle trafficking as it interacts with HIP1, a clathrin-binding protein, to mediate endocytosis, the trafficking of materials into a cell. Huntingtin has also been shown to have a role in the establishment in epithelial polarity through its interaction with RAB11A.

Interactions 
Huntingtin has been found to interact directly with at least 19 other proteins, of which six are used for transcription, four for transport, three for cell signalling, and six others of unknown function (HIP5, HIP11, HIP13, HIP15, HIP16, and CGI-125).  Over 100 interacting proteins have been found, such as huntingtin-associated protein 1 (HAP1) and huntingtin interacting protein 1 (HIP1), these were typically found using two-hybrid screening and confirmed using immunoprecipitation.

Huntingtin has also been shown to interact with:

 HIP2,
 MAP3K10,
 OPTN,
 PRPF40A,
 SETD2,
 TRIP10,
 ZDHHC17.

Mitochondrial dysfunction
Huntingtin is a scaffolding protein in the ATM oxidative DNA damage response complex. Mutant huntingtin (mHtt) plays a key role in mitochondrial dysfunction involving the inhibition of mitochondrial electron transport, higher levels of reactive oxygen species and increased oxidative stress. The promotion of  oxidative damage to DNA may contribute to Huntington's disease pathology.

Clinical significance 

Huntington's disease (HD) is caused by a mutated form of the huntingtin gene, where excessive (more than 36) CAG repeats result in formation of an unstable protein. These expanded repeats lead to production of a huntingtin protein that contains an abnormally long polyglutamine tract at the N-terminus. This makes it part of a class of neurodegenerative disorders known as trinucleotide repeat disorders or polyglutamine disorders. The key sequence which is found in Huntington's disease is a trinucleotide repeat expansion of glutamine residues beginning at the 18th amino acid. In unaffected individuals, this contains between 9 and 35 glutamine residues with no adverse effects. However, 36 or more residues produce an erroneous mutant form of Htt, (mHtt). Reduced penetrance is found in counts 36–39.

Enzymes in the cell often cut this elongated protein into fragments. The protein fragments form abnormal clumps, known as neuronal intranuclear inclusions (NIIs), inside nerve cells, and may attract other, normal proteins into the clumps. The characteristic presence of these clumps in patients was thought to contribute to the development of Huntington disease.  However, later research raised questions about the role of the inclusions (clumps) by showing the presence of visible NIIs extended the life of neurons and acted to reduce intracellular mutant huntingtin in neighboring neurons. One confounding factor is that different types of aggregates are now recognised to be formed by the mutant protein, including protein deposits that are too small to be recognised as visible deposits in the above-mentioned studies. The likelihood of neuronal death remains difficult to predict. Likely multiple factors are important, including: (1) the length of CAG repeats in the huntingtin gene and (2) the neuron's exposure to diffuse intracellular mutant huntingtin protein.  NIIs (protein clumping) can be helpful as a coping mechanism—and not simply a pathogenic mechanism—to stem neuronal death by decreasing the amount of diffuse huntingtin. This process is particularly likely to occur in the striatum (a part of the brain that coordinates movement) primarily, and the frontal cortex (a part of the brain that controls thinking and emotions).

People with 36 to 40 CAG repeats may or may not develop the signs and symptoms of Huntington disease, while people with more than 40 repeats will develop the disorder during a normal lifetime. When there are more than 60 CAG repeats, the person develops a severe form of HD known as juvenile HD. Therefore, the number of CAG (the sequence coding for the amino acid glutamine) repeats influences the age of onset of the disease. No case of HD has been diagnosed with a count less than 36.

As the altered gene is passed from one generation to the next, the size of the CAG repeat expansion can change; it often increases in size, especially when it is inherited from the father. People with 28 to 35 CAG repeats have not been reported to develop the disorder, but their children are at risk of having the disease if the repeat expansion increases.

References

Further reading

External links 
 
 The Huntingtin Protein and Protein Aggregation at HOPES : Huntington's Outreach Project for Education at Stanford
 The HDA  Huntington's Disease Association UK
 
 
 GeneCard
 iHOP

Human proteins
Huntington's disease
Genes on human chromosome 4